Gaston Oula is an Ivorian judoka. He competed in the men's half-middleweight event at the 1984 Summer Olympics.

References

Year of birth missing (living people)
Living people
Ivorian male judoka
Olympic judoka of Ivory Coast
Judoka at the 1984 Summer Olympics
Place of birth missing (living people)